The 2013 IS Open de Tênis was a professional tennis tournament played on clay courts. It was the second edition of the tournament which was part of the 2013 ATP Challenger Tour. It took place in São Paulo, Brazil, on 22–28 April 2013.

Singles entrants

Seeds

 1 Rankings as of 15 April 2013

Other entrants
The following players received wildcards into the singles main draw:
  Pablo Cuevas
  Marcelo Demoliner
  Ricardo Hocevar
  Júlio Silva

The following players received entry as an alternate into the singles main draw:
  Jozef Kovalík
  Eduardo Schwank

The following players received entry from the qualifying draw:
  Pablo Galdón
  Máximo González
  Dušan Lojda
  Rui Machado

Doubles entrants

Seeds

1 Rankings as of 15 April 2013

Other entrants
The following pairs received wildcards into the doubles main draw:
  Thiago Alves /  Augusto Laranja
  Fabiano de Paula /  Júlio Silva
  Rogério Dutra Silva /  Eduardo Russi

Champions

Singles

  Paul Capdeville def.  Renzo Olivo 6–2, 6–2

Doubles

  Marcelo Demoliner /  João Souza def.  James Cerretani /  Pierre-Hugues Herbert 6–2, 4–6, [10–6]

External links
Official website

2013 ATP Challenger Tour
2013
2013 in Brazilian tennis